"Crow's First Lesson" is a poem written by Ted Hughes in 1970.

References
Crafton, John Michael. "Hughes's Crow's First Lesson." Explicator 46.(1988): 32-34. Humanities Full Text (H.W. Wilson). Web. 8 May 2012
Cox, Brian. "Ted Hughes, 1930-1998." Critical Quarterly 15 April 1999: 1. Biography Reference Bank (H.W. Wilson). Web. 8 May 2012.

1970 poems
English poems
Poetry by Ted Hughes